The German Swimming Federation (in German: Deutscher Schwimm-Verband), or DSV is the aquatics national federation for Germany. It oversees competition in the 5 aquatics disciplines (swimming, diving, synchronized swimming, water polo and open water swimming; and Masters competition in these).

It is affiliated to:
FINA, which oversees international swimming;
LEN, which oversees swimming in Europe;
the German Olympic Sports Confederation; and
the German Government's Secretary of State for Sport.

Among other responsibilities, DSV is charged with:
fielding German teams to international aquatics competitions (such as the Olympics),
maintaining the German Records for swimming,
organizing German Championships in aquatics.

DSV was created on 8 August 1886. It has its headquarters in Kassel.

Organisation
President: Christa Thiel

See also
 :de:Deutscher Schwimm-Verbandn–DSV's page on German Wikipedia.
  www.dsv.de—official website.

References

Aquatics
Germany
Swimming in Germany
Swimming organizations
Germany
Sport in Kassel